"Open My Heart" is a song by Yolanda Adams released in 2000. The song gained Adams great popularity in the secular audiences. Being the most groundbreaking single of her career, she won several awards for this song. "Open My Heart" helped her 1999 album Mountain High...Valley Low gain multi-platinum status and reach charts heights not often attained by artists of the gospel genre.

The song peaked at #10 on the Hot R&B/Hip-Hop Songs chart, and #57 on the Billboard Hot 100 chart. Remixes by Steve "Silk" Hurley and Junior Vasquez helped the song peak at #29 on the Hot Dance Club Play Chart.

The song was sampled by Nick Cannon on his single "Can I Live."

Song Credits 

 Produced by Jimmy Jam and Terry Lewis & James "Big Jim" Wright
 Percussion & Live Drums: Stokley Williams
 Guitar: Mike Scott
 Strings arranged by Lee Blaske & Big Jim Wright
 Violins: Brenda Mickens, Carolyn Daws, Elizabeth Sobieski, Michael Sobieski, Elsa Nilsson, Leslie Shank & Thomas Kornacker
 Violas: Alice Preves & Tamas Strasser
 All Other Instruments played by Big Jim Wright
 Background Vocals: Marva King & Yolanda Adams

Track listings
US Promo CD Release (PRCD 1484-2)
 Open Your Heart (Radio Edit) – 5:37
 Open Your Heart (Album Version) – 5:38
 Open Your Heart (Audio Bio – Song) – 1:05
 Open Your Heart (Call-Out Hook) – 0:13

US Promo Remix CD Release (PRCD 1556-2)
 Open My Heart (Pound Boys Radio Edit)
 Open My Heart (Pound Boys Vocal)
 Open My Heart (Pound Boys Dub)

US Promo 12" Remixes (ED 6238)
 Open My Heart (Silk's Spiritual Workout)
 Open My Heart (Silk's Open My Filter Disco Dub Instrumental)
 Open My Heart (Open My Filter Disco Dub)
 Open My Heart (Silk's Spiritual Workout Instrumental)

US Double Vinyl Junior Vasquez Remixes (ED 6261)
 Open My Heart (Junior's Sunday Morning Club Mix)
 Open My Heart (Junior's Uplifting Mix)
 Open My Heart (Junior's Sunday Morning Instrumental)
 Open My Heart (Junior's Sunday Morning Beat)
 Open My Heart (Junior's Acapella)

Charts

Weekly charts

Year-end charts

References 

1999 singles
Music videos directed by Sanaa Hamri
Yolanda Adams songs
Songs written by Jimmy Jam and Terry Lewis
Song recordings produced by Jimmy Jam and Terry Lewis
1998 songs
Elektra Records singles
Contemporary R&B ballads
Songs written by Yolanda Adams